Athor can refer to several things:

 Alternative spelling of Hathor, an Egyptian goddess
 ʾAthor, the Syriac name for Assyria
 Asteroid 161 Athor